Franček Gorazd Tiršek (born 8 March 1975) is a Slovenian sport shooter who has won three silver medals and one bronze at the Paralympic Games. 

Tiršek became a tetraplegic in a car accident in 2003. Prior to the accident, he competed in hunting rifle shooting. At the age of 32, he started practicing Para-shooting. In this sport, Tiršek competes in the SH2 category in the following disciplines: R4 Mixed 10 metre air rifle standing SH2, R5 Mixed 10 metre rifle prone SH2, and R9 Mixed 50 metre rifle prone SH2. Tiršek uses his left hand for shooting.

At the Summer Paralympic Games, Tiršek has represented Slovenia three times, at the 2012 Summer Paralympics in London, at the 2016 Summer Paralympics in Rio de Janeiro, and at the 2020 Summer Paralympics in Tokyo. Each time, he has won a silver medal in the R4 discipline. In addition, he finished 7th in R5 in 2016. He was also the flagbearer for Slovenia at the opening ceremony in Rio in 2016. The medal that Tiršek won in Tokyo was the 50th medal for Slovenia at the Paralympic Games, taking into account the medals that the athletes won when Slovenia was part of Yugoslavia. He is coached by Polonca Sladič, who has coached para-shooters for several Paralympics, and coached Živa Dvoršak at the 2020 Summer Olympics. After the R4 competition, Sladič stated that Tiršek was almost too late for the 11th shot, but he managed to shoot in time. Tiršek stated that he could have aimed for gold if he had more shots available. Later in Tokyo, Tiršek won a bronze medal in the R5 event. 

For his achievements in Para-sports, Tiršek has received several awards and recognitions. He was named Male Athlete of the Year by the Paralympic Sports Federation of Slovenia and the Paralympic Committee of Slovenia in 2012, 2014, 2015, and 2016. He was also named Para Athlete of the Year in 2013 and 2014.

References 

1975 births
Living people
Slovenian male sport shooters
Paralympic shooters of Slovenia
Paralympic silver medalists for Slovenia 
Paralympic bronze medalists for Slovenia 
Paralympic medalists in shooting
Shooters at the 2012 Summer Paralympics
Shooters at the 2016 Summer Paralympics
Shooters at the 2020 Summer Paralympics
21st-century Slovenian people